Kalateh-ye Boshgazi (also Romanized as Kalāteh-ye Boshgazī; also known as Bazqūsh, Buzqush, Kalāteh-ye Losgazī, and Kalāteh-ye Shogazī) is a village in Mud Rural District, Mud District, Sarbisheh County, South Khorasan Province, Iran. At the 2006 census, its population was 105, in 26 families.

References 

Populated places in Sarbisheh County